Zieleniewo  (German Grünhof) is a village in the administrative district of Gmina Kobylanka, within Stargard County, West Pomeranian Voivodeship, in north-western Poland.

The village has a population of 291.

References

Zieleniewo